Ralph Sherlock Kent (August 2, 1878 – April 3, 1949) was an American football coach.  He served as the head football coach at Auburn University for the first five games of the 1902 season, compiling a record of 2–2–1. Kent returned to Cornell to finish up law school after coaching at Auburn. He later become a prominent lawyer in the Buffalo area. He married Alice Kyle.

Kent died of heart disease in 1949 at the age of 70.

Head coaching record

Notes

References

1878 births
1949 deaths
American football centers
Auburn Tigers football coaches
People from Genoa, Ohio